The Baldwin DRS-6-4-750 is a Diesel-electric locomotive built by Baldwin Locomotive Works in 1949. One of these models were built for Office Chérifien des Phosphates (OCP) Railroad in Morocco.

Name Designation
DRS - Diesel Road Switcher 
6 - Six axles 
4 - Four powered axles 
750 - 750 horsepower

Original buyers

References
 

Diesel-electric locomotives of Morocco
A1A-A1A locomotives
DRS-6-4-0750
Railway locomotives introduced in 1949
Standard gauge locomotives of Morocco